Dezful (pronounced , Dezfuli dialect: Desfil, pronounced ) also Romanized as Dezfūl and Dezfool; also known as Dīzfūl and Ab I Diz is a city and capital of Dezful County, Khuzestan Province, Iran.  At the 2011 census, its population was 420,000 people in 105,000 families.  In 2006, the city had 228,507 inhabitants.

Dezful is located 721 kilometers away from the national capital of Tehran and 155 kilometres away from the provincial capital of Ahvaz. The city is located 300 kilometres from the Persian Gulf and is at an altitude of 143 meters.

The city is located at the foot of the Zagros Mountains and has a history that dates back to the Sassanian era. The area around Dezful has been home to civilizations for 5000 years.

Located in an area with a history that extends back to ancient civilization, the city houses a bridge that dates back to 300 AD.

Etymology
The name Dezful has been derived from the two words diz (fortress) + pul (bridge), which in combination could stand for 'the bridge to the fortress' or 'fortified bridge' in Persian language. The original name of the city was Dezhpul, but after  the Muslim conquest of Persia, the city was renamed Dezful, since the Arabic language does not have 'p' and 'zh' sounds.

History
Dezful is one of the oldest cities in the Khuzestan province. According to Walther Hinz excavations, Awan (capital of the first Elam empire) was located in Dezful. The bridge was built during the reign of Shapur I who used Roman prisoners of war after the Battle of Edessa to build the bridge.

People 
The people of Dezful, known as Dezfuli, Dezfoolians or Dezfulians, speak Dezfuli – a dialect distinct to Dezful – and Shushtari, which is sometimes considered the most archaic of Persian dialects.

Geography

Dezful sits close to the foothills of the Zagros Mountains on the main north-south highway from Tehran to Ahvaz, the provincial capital of Khuzestan. The main rail line from Tehran to the Persian Gulf is 15 km (9 mi) from Dezful, on the opposite side of the Dez River.

Climate
Dezful has a hot semi-arid climate (Köppen climate classification BSh) with extremely hot summers and mild winters.

Transportation
There are direct flights from Tehran to Dezful (and reverse) at least twice a day. There are also weekly flights from Dezful to Mashhad (mawhad or mašhad). Dezful can also be reached by the Iranian railways.

Buses are available from almost all Iranian major cities to Dezful or one of its adjacent cities. Trains of the Trans-Iranian Railway serve the neighboring town of Andimeshk.

Twin towns – sister cities
 Tyre, Lebanon

See also
Battle of Dezful
Morteza Ansari, a famous Shia jurisprudent
Gholam Ali Rashid, Iranian commander from Dezful

References

Sources
Iran Census organization

External links
Persian Language and Dezful Tourism
Azarkish Dezful
Dezful Tourism
Dezful News Network
Dezful Magazine
Dezful Unofficial Website

Populated places in Dezful County
Cities in Khuzestan Province